The Sierra Leone national under-17 football team is the national under-17 football team of Sierra Leone and is controlled by the Sierra Leone Football Association.

Competitive record

FIFA U-17 World Cup record

Africa U-17 Cup of Nations record

CAF U-16 and U-17 World Cup Qualifiers record

External links
 Sierra Leone FA

Sierra Leone national football team
African national under-17 association football teams